Mahakaleshwar Jyotirlinga is a Hindu temple dedicated to Shiva and is one of the twelve Jyotirlingas, shrines which are said to be the most sacred abodes of Shiva. It is located in the ancient city of Ujjain in the state of Madhya Pradesh, India. The temple is situated on the side of the holy river Shipra. The presiding deity, Shiva in the lingam form is believed to be Swayambhu, deriving currents of power (Shakti) from within itself as against the other images and lingams that are ritually established and invested with mantra-shakti. 

Madhya Pradesh has two Jyotirlingas, the second one, Omkareshwar Jyotirlinga, is situated about 140 km south of Mahakaleshwar Jyotirlinga.

About Jyotirlingas
As per the Shiva Purana, Brahma and Vishnu once had an argument over who was supreme in the creation. To test them, Shiva pierced the three worlds as an endless pillar of light, the jyotirlinga. Vishnu and Brahma decide to travel along the pillar downwards and upwards respectively, to find the end of the light. Brahma lied that he had found the end, while Vishnu conceded his defeat. Shiva appeared as a second pillar of light and cursed Brahma that he would have no place in ceremonies while Vishnu would be worshipped till the end of eternity. The jyotirlinga is the supreme partless reality, out of which Shiva partly appears. The jyotirlinga shrines, thus are places where Shiva appeared as a fiery column of light. There are 64 forms of Shiva, not to be confused with Jyotirlingas. Each of the twelve jyotirlinga sites take the name of the presiding deity - each considered different manifestation of Shiva. At all these sites, the primary image is lingam representing the beginningless and endless Stambha pillar, symbolizing the infinite nature of Shiva. The twelve jyotirlinga are Somnath in Gujarat, Mallikarjuna at Srisailam in Andhra Pradesh, Mahakaleswar at Ujjain in Madhya Pradesh, Omkareshwar in Madhya Pradesh, Kedarnath in Himalayas in Uttrakhand State, Bhimashankar in Maharashtra, Viswanath at Varanasi in Uttar Pradesh, Triambakeshwar in Maharashtra, Baidyanath Temple, Deoghar in Jharkhand, Nageswar at Dwarka in Gujarat, Rameshwar at Rameswaram in Tamil Nadu and Grishneshwar at Aurangabad in Maharashtra.

The Temple

The idol of Mahakaleshwar is known to be dakshinamukhi, which means that it is facing the south. This is a unique feature, upheld by the tantric shivnetra tradition to be found only in Mahakaleshwar among the 12 Jyotirlingas. The idol of Omkareshwar Mahadev is consecrated in the sanctum above the Mahakal shrine. The images of Ganesh, Parvati and Karttikeya are installed in the west, north, and east of the sanctum sanctorum. To the south is the image of Nandi, the vehicle of Shiva. The idol of Nagchandreshwar on the third storey is open for darshan only on the day of Nag Panchami. The temple has five levels, one of which is underground. The temple itself is located in a spacious courtyard surrounded by massive walls near a lake. The shikhar or the spire is adorned with sculptural finery. Brass lamps light the way to the underground sanctum. It is believed that prasada (holy offering) offered here to the deity can be re-offered unlike all other shrines.

The presiding deity of time, Shiva, in all his splendor, reigns eternally in the city of Ujjain. The temple of Mahakaleshwar, its shikhar soaring into the sky, an imposing façade against the skyline, evokes primordial awe and reverence with its majesty. The Mahakal dominates the life of the city and its people, even in the midst of the busy routine of modern preoccupations, and provides an unbreakable link with ancient Hindu traditions.

On the day of Maha Shivaratri, a huge fair is held near the temple, and worship goes on through the night.

Devotees are not allowed to bring bags , mobile phones and cameras during the visit. Lockers and Cloak Rooms are there for devotees where they can keep their belongings.

Also an awesome spectacle, with huge participation of devotees, is the procession of God Mahakaal in his Palanquin, called Shahi Savaari, to the river Kshipra, on last Monday of the holy period of Sawaan during the months of Shraavana or Bhadrapada.

Vaippu Sthalam
It is one of the shrines of the Vaippu Sthalams sung by Tamil Saivite Nayanar Appar.

The Mahakaleshwar Temple as a Shakti Peeth

The shrine is revered as one of the 18 Maha Shakti Peetham.

Shakti Peethas are shrines that are believed to have enshrined with the presence of Shakti due to the falling of body parts of the corpse of Sati Devi, when Shiva carried it. Each of the 51 Shakti Peethas has shrines for Shakti and Kalabhairava. The Upper Lip of Sati Devi is said to have fallen here and the Shakti is called as Mahakali.

References in Hindu scriptures
According to the Puranas, the city of Ujjain was called Avantika and was famous for its beauty and its status as a devotional epicenter. It was also one of the primary cities where students went to study holy scriptures. According to legend, there was a ruler of Ujjain called Chandrasena, who was a pious devotee of Shiva and worshiped him all the time. One day, a farmer's boy named Shrikhar was walking on the grounds of the palace and heard the King chant the Shiva's name and rushed to the temple to start praying with him. However, the guards removed him by force and sent him to the outskirts of the city near the river Kshipra. Rivals of Ujjain, primarily King Ripudamana and King Singhaditya of the neighboring kingdoms decided to attack the Kingdom and take over its treasures around this time. Hearing this, Shrikhar started to pray and the news spread to a priest named Vridhi. He was shocked to hear this and upon the urgent pleas of his sons, started to pray to Shiva at the river Kshipra. The Kings chose to attack and were successful; with the help of the powerful demon Dushan, who was blessed by Brahma to be invisible, they plundered the city and attacked all the devotees of Shiva.

Upon hearing the pleas of His helpless devotees, Shiva appeared in his Mahakala form and destroyed the enemies of King Chandrasena. Upon the request of his devotees Shrikhar and Vridhi, Shiva agreed to reside in the city and become the chief deity of the Kingdom and take care of it against its enemies and to protect all His devotees. From that day on, Shiva resided in His light form as Mahakala in a Lingam that was formed on its own from the powers of Shiva and his consort, Parvati. Shiva also blessed his devotees and declared that people who worshipped Him in this form would be free from the fear of death and diseases. Also, they would be granted worldly treasures and be under the protection of the Shiva himself.

Bharthari was the elder son of King Gandharva-Sena, and received the kingdom of Ujjain from the celestial god Indra and the King of Dhara.

When Bharthari was king of 'Ujjayani' (modern-day Ujjain) in his state there lived a Brahman who after years of austerities was given the fruit of immortality from the celestial tree of Kalpavriksha. The Brahman presented the same to his monarch, Raja Bharthari, who in turn, passed it on to his love, the beautiful, Pinglah Rani or Ananga Sena Raja Bhartrhari's last and youngest wife. The queen, being in love with the Head police officer of the state, Mahipaala, presented the fruit to him, who further passed it on to his beloved, Lakha, one of the maids of honour. Eventually, Lakha being in love with the king presented the fruit back to the king. Having completed the circle, the fruit revealed the downsides of infidelity to the king, he summoned the queen and ordered her beheading, and ate the fruit himself. After that, he abdicated the throne, and became a religious mendicant.

He later became a disciple of Pattinatthar who first indulged in an argument about samsari and sanyasi with king Bhartrhari. Later during the conversation pattinathar said that all women have 'dual mind' and it might be the true case even with Parameswari. King conveyed this news to Rani Pingalah and she ordered Pattinathar to get punished and to sit in kalu maram (tree, whose top portion would be sharpened like a pencil and whole tree is fully coated with oil, a person who is punished to sit in the top will be split into two pieces), they tried to kill Pattinathar, but Kalu Maram started burning and nothing happened to Pattinathar, the king received the news and went directly to Pattinathar and asked him to get ready to die the next day, but Pattinathar replied, "I'm ready right now, to die". The next day king came with tears in his eyes and released saint from jail because he actually noticed Queen Pingalah in love with horsemen that night, He threw away his empire, wealth, even full coat dress and dressed in a simple kovanam (loincloth), the king became a disciple of Pattinatthar and got moksha (salvation) in the Srikalahasteeshwara Temple in Andhra Pradesh which houses the Vayu Lingam, a part of the Pancha Bhoota Sthalams of Shiva.

Kalidasa, the great Sanskrit poet of the times who was probably a contemporary of king Pushyamitra Sunga, has mentioned about the rituals of the temple in his works in Meghadūta. He mentions about the nada-aradhana, the performance of art and dance during the evening rituals.

History
The temple complex was destroyed by Iltutmish during his raid of Ujjain in 1234–35. The Jyotirlinga was dismantled and believed to be thrown into a nearby 'Kotiteerth Kunda' (a pond neighbouring the temple) with the Jaladhari (a structure supporting the Lingam) stolen during the invasion.

The present structure was built by the Maratha general Ranoji Shinde in 1734 CE after Baji Rao I appointed him to collect taxes in malwa region. Further developments and management was done by other members of shinde dynasty, including Mahadji Shinde (1730 – 12 February 1794) and Daulat Rao Shinde's wife Baiza Bai. (1827–1863). During the reign of Jayajirao Shinde (until 1886), major programs of the then Gwalior State used to be held at this temple.

The Maratha Empire regime was established in Ujjain in the 4th decade of the 18th century. The administration of Ujjain was assigned by Peshwa Bajirao-I to his faithful commander Ranoji Shinde, the Diwan of Ranoji was Sukhatanakar Ramchandra Baba Shenavi who was very wealthy he decided to invest his wealth for religious purposes. In this connection, he re-built the Mahakaleshwar Temple during the 4th and 5th decades of the 18th century.
 
After India became independent in 1947, the Mahakaleshwar Dev Sthan Trust was replaced by the municipal corporation of Ujjain. Nowadays it is under the collectorate office of Ujjain district.

Connectivity
Nearest Airport: Indore

Nearest Railway Station: Ujjain Junction

See also 
Ancient monuments in Ujjain
Pashupathinath temple
Omkareshwar Jyotirlinga

References

Notes
Dictionary of Hindu Lore and Legend, by Anna Dhallapiccola

.

External links

 

Hindu temples in Ujjain
Jyotirlingas
Religion in Ujjain
Shiva temples in Madhya Pradesh
Hindu holy cities
Hindu pilgrimages
Hindu pilgrimage sites
Hindu pilgrimage sites in India
Religious tourism
Religious tourism in India